Enzo Gabriel Martínez Suárez (born 29 April 1998) is a Uruguayan professional footballer who plays as a defender.

Club career
A youth academy graduate of Peñarol, Martínez made his professional debut on 29 April 2018 in Peñarol's 1–0 win against Progreso. He scored his first goal on 19 September 2019 in 2–1 win against Rampla Juniors.

He was loaned to the Portuguese team C.D. Tondela for the 2020-21 season, then Club Atlético Vélez Sarsfield in Argentina for 2021. He moved to the Mexican team Querétaro F.C. on January 1, 2022.

Career statistics

Club

References

External links
Enzo Martínez at playmakerstats.com (English version of ogol.com.br)
 

1998 births
Living people
Peñarol players
Uruguayan Primera División players
Uruguayan footballers
Association football defenders
People from Artigas, Uruguay